Carlo Alberto Guidoboni Cavalchini (26 July 1683 – 7 March 1774) was an Italian Cardinal. Considered papabile in the Papal conclave, 1758, he was vetoed by Louis XV of France under the jus exclusivae.

A lawyer by education, he became titular archbishop of Filippi in 1728, and was created Cardinal in 1743. He became bishop of Albano in 1759 and bishop of Ostia in 1763. Dean of the College of Cardinals 1763–74.

References

External links
Catholic Hierarchy page 
Biography

1683 births
1774 deaths
18th-century Italian cardinals
Cardinal-bishops of Albano
Cardinal-bishops of Ostia
Deans of the College of Cardinals
18th-century Italian Roman Catholic bishops